"Honky Tonk Memories" is a song written by Rory Bourke, Gene Dobbins and Johnny Wilson, and recorded by American country music artist Mickey Gilley.  It was released in June 1977 as the second single from his album First Class.  The song reached number 4 on the Billboard Hot Country Singles chart and number 2 on the RPM Country Tracks chart in Canada.

Chart performance

References

1977 singles
1977 songs
Mickey Gilley songs
Songs written by Rory Bourke
Song recordings produced by Eddie Kilroy
Playboy Records singles
Songs written by Gene Dobbins
Songs written by Johnny Wilson (songwriter)